George Francis White (1808–1898) was a colonel in the British Army who served in the British Raj. He was also an amateur artist and while stationed in India produced a book of engravings and sketches called, Views in India, Chiefly among the Himalaya Mountains.

Many of White's drawings were taken up by professional artists such as J.M.W. Turner, Cotman, Cox, Prout, Copley Fielding, and developed into full-scale works.

After serving in India from 1825 to 1846, he returned to England and became the Chief Constable of Durham Constabulary.

Gallery

References

1808 births
1898 deaths
19th-century English painters
English male painters
Landscape artists
Orientalist painters
19th-century English male artists